"Audacity of Huge" is a 2009 song by Simian Mobile Disco, from their album Temporary Pleasure. It features vocals by Chris Keating of Yeasayer. The music video was directed by Kate Moross.

The Guardian has described the song as the "lament (of) an uber-materialist". Its title is an allusion to Barack Obama's The Audacity of Hope.

Reception
At Pitchfork, Marc Hogan called it "a limber, name-dropping, ear-catching body-mover, sleek and uncluttered and populist". Consequence of Sound stated that the lyrics were "hopelessly catchy non sequiturs", while NME felt that they were the only thing that made the song "listenable" (instead of "as annoying as stubbing your toe"). The Quietus praised it as "amusingly bizarre" and "a pitch-perfect satire of the bling-bejewelled breast-beating so prevalent on 808s and Heartbreaks".

Charts

References

External links
Official video

2009 songs
2009 singles
Simian Mobile Disco songs